The Embezzler is a 1954 British crime film directed by John Gilling, and starring Charles Victor, Zena Marshall and Cyril Chamberlain. It was made as a second feature shot at Twickenham Studios and on location around London. The film's sets were designed by the art director C. Wilfred Arnold.

The story concerns a bank cashier who steals cash from the bank where he is employed.

Plot
Henry Paulson, a quiet, respectable, henpecked, elderly bank cashier learns that he has only a couple of years left to live. He decides to embezzle money from the bank where he works and enjoy the rest of his days in South America. He books a train ticket at the travel agent and checks the itinerary of a ship and takes his suitcase to work on a quiet Friday afternoon hoping not to be discovered until Monday.

Caught in the act by his boss returning unexpectedly, the embezzler locks his boss in his office and flees to a seaside hotel in Eastbourne run by Mrs Larkin booking in under the name of Mr Laughton. There, he joins a group of residents including Mrs Forrest, who has problems of her own as she is being blackmailed by a former lover, Mr Johnson, recently released from prison. Johnson has tracked her down and booked into the same hotel. He thinks, as her husband is a GP, she will wish to hide her past. Johnson also tries to take advantage of fellow resident Miss Ackroyd, tricking her into giving him her string of pearls after deliberately snapping their thread.

Paulson hears Johnson threaten Mrs Forrest and follows her to investigate. He gives her the money she needs to give to Johnson in exchange for her love letters. After passing him the money Johnson demands a further £100 for the photostat copies he has made. Johnson returns Miss Ackroyd her pearls but then tricks her out of a valuable ring and into withdrawing her savings from the bank. He says they are engaged. Meanwhile the serial numbers of the missing notes start to appear in town. Johnson works out who Paulson is and blackmails him too, demanding half his stolen money. They chat in Paulson's room and Johnson helps himself to whisky. Paulson poisons the whisky for Johnson's next visit. Johnson works out what has happened and runs off. He meets Dr Foster on the stairs and they fight just as the police arrive downstairs.

The fight with Johnson brings on Paulson's heart condition, and he dies. Dr Forrest tells his wife that he already knew about Johnson before they married.

Cast
 Charles Victor as Henry Paulson/Mr Laughton
 Zena Marshall as Mrs Forrest 
 Cyril Chamberlain as Alec Johnson 
 Leslie Weston as Piggott 
 Avice Landone as Miss Ackroyd 
 Peggy Mount as Mrs Larkin 
 Michael Craig as Doctor Forrest 
 Frank Forsyth (credited as Frank Forsythe) as Inspector Gale
 Christopher Banks as Vicar (uncredited) 
 Dennis Chinnery as Bank Clerk (uncredited) 
 Ian Fleming as Doctor (uncredited) 
 Alastair Hunter as Bank Manager (uncredited) 
 Patrick Jordan as Police Sergeant (uncredited)  
 Carole Lesley as Tea Shop Waitress (uncredited)
 Sam Kydd as Railway Inspector (uncredited)  
 Phyllis Morris as Mrs. Paulson (uncredited) 
 Ronnie Stevens as Travel Agent (uncredited) 
 Martin Wyldeck as 2nd Police Sergeant (uncredited)

Critical reception
Sky Movies calls the film a "fascinating British co-feature which supplied the elderly but excellent Charles Victor (also a perfect Inspector Teal in The Saint's Return) with his only leading role, as an embezzler".

References

External links

1954 films
British crime films
1954 crime films
Films directed by John Gilling
Films shot at Twickenham Film Studios
Films set in London
Films shot in London
1950s English-language films
British black-and-white films
1950s British films